Hans Glad Bloch (16 September 1791 – 31 December 1865) was a Norwegian military officer and government official.

Born in Sør-Odal, he reached the rank of General in 1850. His career included a period as commander of the Norwegian Military Academy (1835–38) and commanding positions at the fortresses of Bergenhus and Fredriksten. He also worked as a surveyor while in the military, and in 1823 he released a road map of Norway. Later in life, he entered civil service, and served as Minister of the Army from 1853 to 1856, member of the Council of State Division in Stockholm from 1856 to 1857, and again as Minister of the Army from 1857 to 1860. He resigned his position on 28 September 1860.

References

1791 births
1865 deaths
Norwegian Army generals
Government ministers of Norway
19th-century Norwegian politicians
Academic staff of the Norwegian Military Academy
People from Sør-Odal
Defence ministers of Norway